La Sagesse School was a 3–16, Roman Catholic, private school for girls in Jesmond, Newcastle upon Tyne, Tyne and Wear, England. It was established in 1906 and closed in 2008. It occupied Jesmond Towers, a Grade II* listed building and was located in the Roman Catholic Diocese of Hexham and Newcastle.

History 
Jesmond Towers was built to a gothic design in the early nineteenth century. In 1869 it was bought by Charles Mitchell and his wife, Anne, who made it their family home. Their son, who was a great art enthusiast, displayed important paintings in the lounge. In 1890, Anne's sister, Emily, who was in a state of depression following the death of her husband, threw herself from the battlements of Jesmond Towers and is said to haunt the building: she is referred to as the Pink Lady.

Following Anne Mitchell's death in 1899, her son, Charles William Mitchell, inherited the house and, following Charles William Mitchell's death in 1903, the Mitchell family moved to Pallinburn, near Ford, Northumberland. Jesmond Towers was  acquired by the Filles de la Sagesse (Daughters of Wisdom in English) in 1912.

The school established its own board of governors and rented the building from the Daughters of Wisdom. However the school faced increasing competition from other local private schools (e.g. the Royal Grammar School, Newcastle) and when the Daughters of Wisdom decided to treble the rent in 2008, the Governors decided to close the school.

In 2009, Freddy Shepherd (a Newcastle United F.C. shareholder) acquired the site for development and in 2013, sold the house to Jeff Winn, a solicitor, who secured that part of the site as part of a joint purchase with David Wilson Homes.

Notable alumnae 
 Gillian Allnutt, poet
 Jo Beall, academic
 Joanna Pickering, actress, writer, activist and model
 Linden Travers, actress
 Susan Williams, junior minister
 Denise Welch, actress and television presenter

Notes

References

External links 
  (Archive)

Defunct schools in Newcastle upon Tyne
Defunct Catholic schools in the Diocese of Hexham and Newcastle
Educational institutions established in 1906
1906 establishments in England
Educational institutions disestablished in 2008
2008 disestablishments in England